Larose or LaRose is a surname. Notable people with the surname include:

Politics and activism
Achille Larose (1839-1904), Canadian politician
Frank LaRose (born 1979), American politician
Gérald Larose (born 1945), Canadian activist
Jean-François Larose (born 1972), Canadian politician
Josue Larose, American activist
Christopher LaRose, American Prison Warden

Sports

Baseball
John LaRose (born 1951), American baseball player
Vic LaRose (born 1944), American baseball player

Gridiron football
Dan LaRose (born 1939), American football player
J. R. LaRose (born 1984), Canadian football player

Ice hockey
Bonner Larose (1901-1963), Canadian ice hockey player
Chad LaRose (born 1982), American ice hockey player
Claude Larose (disambiguation), multiple people
Cory Larose (born 1975), Canadian ice hockey player
Guy Larose (born 1967), Canadian ice hockey player
Paul Larose (born 1950), Canadian ice hockey player
Ray LaRose (born 1941), Canadian ice hockey player

Other sports
David Larose (born 1985), French judoka
Gilbert Larose (1942-2006), Canadian gymnast
Guy Larose, Canadian professional wrestler known as Hans Schmidt
Simon Larose (born 1978), Canadian tennis player

Other fields
Colleen LaRose (born 1963), American citizen
Ferdinand Larose (1888-1955), Canadian forester
J. Larose, Navajo actor
Raun Larose (born 1986), American fashion designer
Scott LaRose (born 1967), American comedian

See also
De la Rose (surname)
La Rose (surname)